Richard A. Bettis is the Ellison Distinguished Professor of Strategy and Entrepreneurship at the Kenan-Flagler Business School, University of North Carolina at Chapel Hill. He is known for his work on corporate strategy, global business strategy and strategic management. He is a former president of the Strategic Management Society and was the Co-Editor of Strategic Management Journal from 2007-2015.

In 1986, Bettis and his co-author C.K. Prahalad coined the term dominant logic to describe deep-set cultural norms and thought patterns that drive managerial action in firms.

Selected publications
Hu, Songcui, Zi‐Lin He, Daniela P. Blettner, and Richard A. Bettis. "Conflict inside and outside: Social comparisons and attention shifts in multidivisional firms." Strategic Management Journal (2016).
Kim, Changhyun, and Richard A. Bettis. "Cash is surprisingly valuable as a strategic asset." Strategic Management Journal 35, no. 13 (2014): 2053-2063.
Bettis, Richard A., and Michael A. Hitt. "The new competitive landscape." Strategic management journal 16, no. S1 (1995): 7-19.
Bettis, Richard A., and Coimbatore K. Prahalad. "The dominant logic: Retrospective and extension." Strategic management journal 16, no. 1 (1995): 5-14.
Prahalad, Coimbatore K., and Richard A. Bettis. "The dominant logic: A new linkage between diversity and performance." Strategic management journal 7, no. 6 (1986): 485-501.
Bettis, Richard A., and Vijay Mahajan. "Risk/return performance of diversified firms." Management Science 31, no. 7 (1985): 785-799.
Bettis, Richard A. "Performance differences in related and unrelated diversified firms." Strategic Management Journal 2, no. 4 (1981): 379-393

References

American business theorists
Living people
University of North Carolina at Chapel Hill faculty
Year of birth missing (living people)